The electoral district of Mulgrave is situated in the south-east of the Melbourne Metropolitan Region. The electorate contains the suburbs of Mulgrave and Noble Park North. It also contains parts of the suburbs of Dandenong North, Noble Park, Springvale and Wheelers Hill.

The seat previously existed from 1958 to 1967 as a safe Liberal seat. It was abolished in 1967 and replaced by Syndal.

Mulgrave was recreated in 2002 as a marginal Labor seat, replacing Dandenong North. Labor's Daniel Andrews easily won the seat amid that year's massive Labor landslide, and has held it ever since. He was elected as leader of Victorian Labor following its shock defeat in 2010, and has served as Premier since 2014.

Members for Mulgrave

Election results

References

External links
 Electoral Profile: Electoral district of Mulgrave, Victorian Electoral Commission

Electoral districts of Victoria (Australia)
1958 establishments in Australia
1967 disestablishments in Australia
2002 establishments in Australia
City of Monash
City of Greater Dandenong
Electoral districts and divisions of Greater Melbourne